Jim Blashfield (born September 4, 1944, Seattle, Washington) is an American filmmaker and media artist, best known for his short films such as Suspicious Circumstances and The Mid-Torso of Inez, and his music videos for musicians Talking Heads, Joni Mitchell, Nu Shooz, Paul Simon, Peter Gabriel, Michael Jackson, Tears for Fears, Marc Cohn, and "Weird Al" Yankovic. He has collaborated with Bill Frisell and the Oregon Symphony.

Blashfield is the recipient of a Cannes Golden Lion, a Grammy Award, and 17 MTV Video Music Award nominations, including 3 Awards.

Other films include Bunnyheads, SuctionMaster, Vanity, and The Tasseled Loafers, an irreverent interpretation of Hector Berlioz' Dream of a Witch's Sabbath with music by the Czech Philharmonic, and the recent film Basement Suite.

Recent multi-image installations include the 11 screen welded aluminum sculpture "Mechanism", Tilicum Crossing's "Flooded Data Machine", the 7 screen "Circulator" and the 5 screen "Conveyor".

Filmography

Selected short films

The Mid-Torso of Inez, (1978) Produced in collaboration with Vern Luce 
Suspicious Circumstances, (1985) Music by Steve Koski, Ken Butler and Stan Wood
My Dinner with the Devil Snake (1990)
 The Tasseled Loafers, (2001) Music by Hector Berlioz and the Czech Philharmonic 
St. Helens Road, (2002) Music by the Land Camera Micro Orchestra (2002)
The Lone Ranger, (2002) Music by Bill Frisell 
Bunnyheads, (2007) Based on the sculpture of Christine Bourdette, co-produced with Lourri Hammack 
SuctionMaster: Triumph of Science (2008)
Vanity (2010)

Moving Image Installations

Evolution of a City, (1997)  Produced in collaboration with Carol Sherman
Running Dog w/ Cactus, (2002) 
The Resurrectory, (2004) In collaboration with the Liminal Performance Group
Conveyor, (2010)
Circulator, (2011)
Flooded Data Machine, (2015
Mechanism (2017)

Theater / Performance

Bird of Paradise", (1989)  Written and directed in collaboration with Victoria Parker

Music videos

"And She Was", Talking Heads (1985) / MTV Nominations (1986): Best Group Video, Best Concept Video
"Good Friends,  Joni Mitchell (1985)
"I Can't Wait", Nu Shooz (1985)
"Boy in the Bubble", Paul Simon (1986) / MTV Nominations (1987): Best Video, Best Special Effects, Best Art Direction, Most Experimental, Viewers' Choice
"Don't Give Up" (version 2), Peter Gabriel & Kate Bush (1986)
"Leave Me Alone", Michael Jackson (1989) / Grammy Award (1990): Best Short Form Music Video / Cannes Golden Lion Award (1989): Best Special Effects / MTV Award (1989): Best Special Effects / MTV Nominations (1989): Best Video, Breakthrough Video, Best Art Direction, Best Editing, Viewers' Choice
"Sowing the Seeds of Love", Tears for Fears (1989) / MTV Awards (1990): Breakthrough Video, Best Special Effects / MTV Nominations (1990): Best Group Video, Best Post-Modern Video
"Walk Through the World", Marc Cohn (1993)
"Pancreas", "Weird Al" Yankovic (2006)

Sesame Street

Blashfield Studio produced several segments directed by others for Sesame Street during the 1980s and the 1990s.

The Word is No
Monster in the Mirror
Exploring in Your Closet
Forty Blocks from My Home
Isadora's Sneakers - a short about the seasons
I Like to Pretend - I Can Fly / I'm an Astronaut

References

Blashfield interview at the Golden Age of Music Video website

External links
Blashfield Studio website

1944 births
Living people
Animators from Washington (state)
American animated film directors
American music video directors
Filmmakers from Seattle
Grammy Award winners